The Austrian Ludwig Wittgenstein Society was first established in 1974 to promote philosophical conferences, workshops, summer schools, and research that are inspired by the work of Ludwig Wittgenstein and the Vienna Circle.  It is an international society, which also has a publication series.

History

The society was founded in 1974 by Elisabeth Leinfellner, Werner Leinfellner, Rudolf Haller, Paul Weingartner, and Adolf Hübner. The impetus of the first International Wittgenstein Symposium in Kirchberg am Wechsel, Lower Austria, led to its development as an international society. The location of the society is in Kirchberg am Wechsel; the location was selected because Ludwig Wittgenstein taught at elementary schools close to Kirchberg am Wechsel in the 1920s.

Goals

The society has two primary goals. The first is to promote the analysis, tradition, and dissemination of Wittgenstein's philosophy. The second is to promote, more generally, philosophy that has its roots in Austria and other countries with emphasis on analytic philosophy inspired by Wittgenstein, and philosophy of science inspired by, but not limited to, the philosophy of the Vienna Circle.

Membership
The society currently reports 210 members both national and international. Membership is decided by the Executive Committee of the society based on academic criteria.

Publications

The society has published its proceedings since the first International Wittgenstein Symposium.  In 2006, they started a new series, published by Ontos Verlag. The new series contains the official proceedings of the International Wittgenstein Symposium, special workshops, and high-quality publications submitted to and reviewed by the society.

International Ludwig Wittgenstein Institute (ILWI)

The ILWI was recently founded by the society, and supports scientific and cultural projects that are related to Wittgenstein's philosophy and the goals of the society. The ILWI presents workshops, summer schools, Wittgenstein lectures, and research opportunities at the ILWI.

Sponsorship
The society is funded by the government of Lower Austria, the Austrian Federal Ministry for Science and Research, Raiffeisenbank NÖ-Süd Alpin, Kirchberg am Wechsel, membership fees, and donations. The Wiener Zeitung newspaper is the current media collaborator for the society.

See also

Ludwig Wittgenstein
International Wittgenstein Symposium
Haus Wittgenstein
Tractatus Logico-Philosophicus
Philosophical Investigations
On Certainty

References

External links
Austrian Ludwig Wittgenstein Society
British Wittgenstein Society
Nordic Wittgenstein Society

Ludwig Wittgenstein
Philosophical societies
Analytic philosophy